Lev Landau (1908 – 1968), Soviet physicist who made fundamental contributions to many areas of theoretical physics, is the eponym of the topics in physics listed below.

Physics
Darrieus–Landau instability
Derjaguin–Landau–Verwey–Overbeek theory
Landau damping
Landau distribution
Landau's Fermi-liquid theory
Landau gauge
Landau kinetic equation
Landau pole
Landau potential
Landau principle
Landau quantization
Landau levels
Landau diamagnetism
Landau theory
Landau-Squire jet
Ivanenko–Landau–Kähler equation
Landau–Hopf theory of turbulence
Stuart-Landau equation
Landau-Levich problem
Landau–Hopf theory of turbulence
Ginzburg–Landau theory
Landau–Lifshitz aeroacoustic equation
Landau-Raychaudhuri equation
Landau–Zener formula
Landau–Lifshitz model
Landau-Lifshitz pseudotensor
Landau–Lifshitz–Gilbert equation
Landau–Placzek ratio
Landau–Pomeranchuk–Migdal effect
Landau–Yang theorem

Astronomy
Two celestial objects are named in his honour:
 the minor planet 2142 Landau.
 the lunar crater Landau.

Other 
Film project DAU
Korets-Landau leaflet
Landau Gold Medal
Landau Institute for Theoretical Physics

Landau
Lev Landau